Dog Ear Records (ドッグイヤーレコーズ) is a music production company founded by video game composer Nobuo Uematsu in November 2006. The company publishes video game soundtracks and original albums on disc and digitally through iTunes. The website includes community features including a bilingual blog, YouTube channel, radio program and information related to live performances taking place in the Tokyo area.

Outline

The company is based in the Meguro area of the city of Tokyo, Japan.  In February 2007, the "DERBLOG" weblog launched, reporting on the company's releases and live events.  Blog posts were written in English and Japanese by the company director Hiroki Ogawa under the handle wappa. In October, of the same year, an online radio program called "Inu Mimi Radio" began, hosted by Uematsu.  The show invited guests including participants of The Black Mages concert series, including Kenichiro Fukui, Michio Okamiya, and Arata Hanyuda. The first Dog Ear Records live showcase took place November 24, 2008, and featured Keita Egusa, a pianist whose album "KALAYCILAR" was published by the record label.

History

The first international event Dog Ear Records participated in took place October 20, 2007, in Stockholm, Sweden.  Distant Worlds: Music from Final Fantasy featured selections from Uematsu's music from the Final Fantasy series performed by the Royal Stockholm Philharmonic Orchestra.  Shortly thereafter, the company organized a live event on November 19 titled "Microsoft Presents 'Orchestral Pieces from LOST ODYSSEY & BLUE DRAGON'" taking place at the Bunkamura Orchard Hall in Tokyo.  In March 2008, Dog Ear Records announced the release of the album THE BLACK MAGES III Darkness and Starlight.  A live concert took place at the Yokohama Blitz in August.  The same month, the company began international digital releases via the iTunes Store.

Staff
Nobuo Uematsu
Hiroki Ogawa
Itsuki Iwasa
Tsutomu Narita
Michio Okamiya

Discography
2006
Blue Dragon

2007
Anata wo Yurusanai
Lost Odyssey

2008
The Black Mages III - Darkness and Starlight
KALAYCILAR
saru monkey breaks

2009
Lord of Vermilion
Sakura Note: Ima ni Tsunagaru Mirai

2010
Xenoblade Chronicles

2011
The Last Story
Earthbound Papas: Octave Theory

2012
Fantasy Life

2013
Earthbound Papas: Dancing Dad

References

External links
Dog Ear Records website
DERBLOG

Japanese record labels
Record labels established in 2006